Anania ademonalis is a moth in the family Crambidae. It was described by Francis Walker in 1859. It is found in Rio de Janeiro, Brazil.

References

Moths described in 1859
Pyraustinae
Moths of South America